Nahuel Nicolás Iribarren (born 2 February 1988) is an Argentine professional footballer who plays as a centre-back for Club Blooming.

Career
San Lorenzo were Iribarren's first club. Diego Simeone oversaw the defender's breakthrough into senior football in 2009–10, as Iribarren made three appearances across fixtures against Rosario Central, Arsenal de Sarandí and Gimnasia y Esgrima. Ahead of the 2010–11 campaign, Iribarren completed a loan move to Ferro Carril Oeste. He returned to his parent team months later after no competitive matches in Primera B Nacional. In January 2011, Iribarren switched to Almagro. Further stints with Rosamonte and Sarmiento in Torneo Argentino B followed - bringing twenty-nine games and one goal in the fourth tier.

On 30 June 2014, Iribarren joined Primera B Metropolitana side Colegiales. He remained for two seasons, making thirty-seven appearances and netting three goals; as well as receiving two red cards within a month of each other during the 2015 season. Iribarren then moved across the division to play for Estudiantes. After one goal in forty-seven encounters for Estudinates, Iribarren signed with regional league outfit Fernando Cáceres. In January 2018, Platense signed Iribarren. His first campaign ended with promotion as champions, as they beat his former club Estudiantes in a promotion play-off to collect the title.

In January 2022, Iribarren joined Bolivian Primera División side Club Blooming.

Career statistics
.

Honours
Platense
Primera B Metropolitana: 2017–18

References

External links

1988 births
Living people
Argentine footballers
Argentine expatriate footballers
People from Posadas, Misiones
Argentine people of Basque descent
Association football defenders
Argentine Primera División players
Torneo Argentino B players
Primera B Metropolitana players
Primera Nacional players
Bolivian Primera División players
San Lorenzo de Almagro footballers
Ferro Carril Oeste footballers
Club Almagro players
Sarmiento de Resistencia footballers
Club Atlético Colegiales (Argentina) players
Estudiantes de Buenos Aires footballers
Club Atlético Platense footballers
Club Blooming players
Argentine expatriate sportspeople in Bolivia
Expatriate footballers in Bolivia
Sportspeople from Misiones Province